The Southwest Pama–Nyungan or Nyungic language group is the most diverse and widespread, though hypothetical, subfamily of the Pama–Nyungan language family of Australia.  It contains about fifty distinct languages.

Internal classification
The Kanyara and Mantharta languages appear to be the most divergent of the Southwest languages. The others are sometimes collected under the name Nyungic.

Kanyara
Mantharta
Nyungic
Ngayarda
Kartu
Nyungar
Mangarla
Mirning (Mirniny)
Wati (Western Desert language)
Marrngu
Ngarrka–Ngumpin
Yura

Validity
The proposal has been largely abandoned. Bowern (2011) restricts "Southwest Pama–Nyungan" to Nyungar plus Kalaaku. (See Nyungic languages.)

Footnotes

References
Dixon, R. M. W. (2002). Australian Languages: Their Nature and Development. Cambridge: Cambridge University Press.

 
South West (Western Australia)